Francine Saillant (born 1953) is a Canadian anthropologist and intellectual.

Biography
Saillant received her Ph.D. from McGill University in 1987. She is a professor in the Department of Anthropology at Laval University since 1996; and serves as the Director of the Centre interuniversitaire sur les lettres, les arts et les traditions (Interuniversity Centre for letters, arts and traditions; CÉLAT). Saillant has directed the efforts of the journal Anthropologie et sociétés for more ten years. 
She was appointed in 2008 to be a member of the Royal Society of Canada. In 2013, she was co-chair of the 81st Congress of the Association francophone pour le savoir.

Selected works
2013 Droits et cultures en mouvements (avec Karoline Truchon, dirs). Québec, PUL, 288 p. 
2012 Afrodescendances, cultures et droits (avec Alexandrine Boudreault-Fournier, dirs). Québec, PUL, 244 p. 
2012 Récits collectifs et nouvelles écritures visuelles (avec Michaël La Chance, dirs). Québec, PUL, 276 p.
2011 Manifeste de Lausanne. Pour une anthropologie non hégémonique (avec Mondher Kilani et Florence Graezer Bideau, dirs). Montréal, Liber, 141 p. 
2009 Exclusions et inégalités sociales. Enjeux et défis de l'intervention publique (avec Éric Gagnon, Yolande Pelchat, Michèle Clément). Québec, PUL, 206 p.
2009 Réinventer l'anthropologie? Les sciences de la culture à l'épreuve des globalisations, Montréal, Liber,  252 p.
2007 Identités, handicaps, interventions posthumanitaires au Brésil. La dignité pour horizon. Paris, Karthala, 412 p. 
 2006 Medical Anthropology. Regional Perspectives and Shared Concerns (avec Serge Genest). Malden, Blackwell Publishing, 305 p. 
 2006 De la responsabilité. Éthique et politique (avec Éric Gagnon). Montréal, Liber, Collection Éthique publique hors série, 287 p.
 2005 Anthropologie de la santé. Ancrages locaux, défis globaux (avec Serge Genest). Québec, PUL/Anthropos, 450 p.
 2005 Communautés et socialités (avec Éric Gagnon). Montréal, Liber, 281 p.
 2004 Identités, vulnérabilités, communautés (avec Michèle Clément et Charles Gaucher). Québec, Nota bene, 333 p.
 2003 Transformations sociales, genre et santé. Perspectives critiques et comparatives (avec Manon Boulianne, dirs). Québec/Paris, PUL/L'Harmattan, 306 p.
 2002 Fenêtres ouvertes. Dire et partager l'aide et les soins (avec Odile Sévigny et Sylvie Khandjian). Montréal, Écosociété, 199 p.
 2000 GAGNON Eric, Francine SAILLANT, et autres. De la dépendance et de l'accompagnement. Soins à domicile et liens sociaux. Québec, Paris, PUL/l'Harmattan, 232 p.
 1996 Interior Passages. Obesity and Transformation. Toronto, Second Story Press, Traduction anglaise de Au cœur de la baleine (Montréal, Remue-Ménage, 1994). 
 1994 Au cœur de la baleine. Obésité et  transformation. Montréal, Remue-Ménage, 158 p.
 1988 Culture et cancer. Produire le sens de la maladie. Montréal, St Martin, 317 p.
 1997 Accoucher autrement. Repères historiques, sociaux et culturels sur la grossesse et l'accouchement au Québec (avec Michel O'Neill). Montréal, St-Martin. 585 p.
 1983 Essai sur la santé des femmes (avec Maria De Koninck et Lise Dunnigan). Québec, Conseil du statut de la femme, 341 p.
 1981 Ruptures. Montréal, Dérives

Filmography
 2010 Les voix Zumbi (with Alexandrine Boudreault-Fournier), CÉLAT, Université Laval, 15 minutes. 
 2009 Vie et mort dans le candomblé (with Pedro Simonard), Québec, LAMIC, Université Laval. 75 minutes
 2009 Le navire négrier(with Pedro Simonard), Québec, LAMIC, Université Laval. 45 minutes
 2009 Axé Dignité (with Pedro Simonard), Québec, LAMIC, Université Laval. 52 minute
 2007 Buscapé. Un espace pour tous (with Patrick Fougeyrollas and Merdad Hage). Montréal, les productions de l'Autre Œil. 20 minutes

Awards 
 2008: Member, Société royale du Canada
 1996: Prix Laura-Jamienson de l'ICREF (Institut canadien de recherche sur les femmes)
 1988: Prix de l'Association des éditeurs Canadiens

References

1953 births
Living people
Canadian anthropologists
Canadian women anthropologists
Academic staff of Université Laval
Fellows of the Royal Society of Canada
McGill University alumni
21st-century Canadian women scientists
Canadian women non-fiction writers
20th-century Canadian non-fiction writers
20th-century Canadian women writers
21st-century Canadian non-fiction writers
21st-century Canadian women writers
Canadian non-fiction writers in French